A cornucopia is a horn or horn-shaped basket and symbol of abundance. It may also refer to:

Places 
 Cornucopia (Middletown, Delaware), listed on the National Register of Historic Places in New Castle County, Delaware
Cornucopia, Oregon
Cornucopia Peak, a mountain in Oregon
Cornucopia, Wisconsin
Cornucopia, fictional country in The Ickabog by JK Rowling

Arts, entertainment, and media

Music 
Cornucopia (album), a 1970 album by jazz trumpeter Dizzy Gillespie
"Cornucopia" (song), song by Black Sabbath from their 1972 album Black Sabbath Vol. 4
"Cornucopia", the second single from the album Harakiri by Serj Tankian
Cornucopia (concert tour), a 2019 Björk concert tour

Other arts, entertainment, and media
Cornucopia (magazine), a magazine about Turkish culture
Cornucopia, the fourth add-on to the card game Dominion
CORNucopia, Historic Hudson Valley's annual autumn corn harvest festival, held at Philipsburg Manor in Sleepy Hollow, New York

Other uses
Cornucopia Institute, a non-profit organization in Cornucopia, Wisconsin focused on small-scale farming
 Teatro da Cornucópia, theatre company in Lisbon

See also 
Cornucopian, an optimistic futurist